Somjit Jongjohor (born January 19, 1975) is an amateur Thai boxer best known for winning gold medals in the flyweight division at the 2003 World Amateur Boxing Championships and at the Beijing 2008 Olympics.

Career
Somjit won the Asian Games 2002.

In the 2003 World Amateur Boxing Championships final in his home country he beat Frenchman Jérôme Thomas, who went on to win Olympic silver in 2004.

At the Olympics 2004, Somjit had bad luck with the draw and was outpointed by Cuban eventual winner Yuriorkis Gamboa.

At the 2005 World Amateur Boxing Championships he was surprised in his first match by Cuban southpaw Andry Laffita and lost 14:16. In 2005 he also competed for Thailand at the Boxing World Cup in Moscow, Russia, winning both his matches in the preliminary round.

He won silver at the 2006 Asian Games in the Flyweight (-51 kg) division when he was upset by Filipino boxer Violito Payla 15-31. He had beaten the Filipino three times before.

He beat Vincenzo Picardi to reach the finals in the 2007 World Amateur Boxing Championships where he lost against local southpaw Raushee Warren.

He represented Thailand in the Beijing 2008 Olympics Flyweight category and said that it would be his last contest after which he would continue his boxing career as a national team coach.

He won his first gold medal in the Beijing 2008 Olympics Flyweight category 51 kg defeating Andry Laffita of Cuba 8-2.

In Muay thai his name is Silachai Wor preecha. Weerapon Jongjoho, the middleweight bronze medalist in 2021 World Championships, is his nephew.

Olympic games results 
2004 (as a flyweight)
Defeated Kim Ki-Suk (South Korea) 22-12
Lost to Yuriorkis Gamboa (Cuba) 21-26

2008 (as a flyweight)
Defeated Eddie Valenzuela (Guatemala) 6-1
Defeated Samir Mammadov (Azerbaijan) 10-2
Defeated Anvar Yunusov (Tajikistan) 8-1
Defeated Vincenzo Picardi (Italy) 7-1
Defeated Andry Laffita (Cuba) 8-2

World amateur championships results 
2003 (as a flyweight)
Defeated Ramazan Ballioglu (Turkey) RSCO 3
Defeated Bato-Munko Vankeev (Belarus) 10-5
Defeated Yuriorkis Gamboa (Cuba) 23-22
Defeated Rustamhodza Rahimov (Germany) 12-5
Defeated Jerome Thomas (boxer) (France) 24-17

2005 (as a flyweight)
Lost to Andry Laffita (Cuba) 14-16

2007 (as a flyweight)
Defeated Ramadan Rezgallah (Egypt) 17-9
Defeated Mirat Sarsembayev (Kazakhstan) 17-8
Defeated Rafał Kaczor (Poland) 15-3
Defeated Vincenzo Picardi (Italy) 13-2
Lost to Rau'shee Warren (United States) 9-13 (final match)

Discography

TV Dramas

TV Series

TV Sitcom

Film

Master of Ceremony: MC ON TV

Director of the program

References

External links
 

 

1975 births
Living people
Somjit Jongjohor
Somjit Jongjohor
Somjit Jongjohor
Olympic medalists in boxing
Boxers at the 2004 Summer Olympics
Boxers at the 2008 Summer Olympics
Medalists at the 2008 Summer Olympics
Asian Games medalists in boxing
Somjit Jongjohor
Somjit Jongjohor
Boxers at the 2002 Asian Games
Boxers at the 2006 Asian Games
Medalists at the 2002 Asian Games
Medalists at the 2006 Asian Games
AIBA World Boxing Championships medalists
Somjit Jongjohor
Southeast Asian Games medalists in boxing
Somjit Jongjohor
Competitors at the 2001 Southeast Asian Games
Flyweight boxers
Somjit Jongjohor
Muay Thai promoters
Somjit Jongjohor
Thai television personalities